Alistar Bruce Jordan (born 5 September 1949) is a former New Zealand cricketer who played first-class cricket for Central Districts from 1969 to 1980.

A right-arm opening bowler, Jordan's best figures in first-class cricket were 7 for 82 against Otago in 1972–73. He was a member of the New Zealand team that briefly toured Australia in 1972–73.

Jordan also played Hawke Cup cricket for Taranaki from 1966 to 1992, and was named in the Hawke Cup Team of the Century in 2011. He has been a player, coach and administrator in Taranaki for more than 50 years. In 2010 he was awarded life membership of the Taranaki Cricket Association.

References

External links

1949 births
Living people
New Zealand cricketers
Central Districts cricketers
Taranaki cricketers
Cambridgeshire cricketers